Yaw Ihle Amankwah (born 7 July 1988) is a former Norwegian professional footballer.

Career
Amankwah has a Ghanaian father and a Norwegian mother and was born in Bergen. After playing for Fana IL, Amankwah was bought by Brann in the summer of 2007, but was loaned out to Fana for the rest of the 2007 season. After playing 30 games for Alta in the 2009 season he returned to Brann in November 2009 to take part in the preparation for the 2010 season.

In January 2012 Amankwah joined Sandefjord Fotball.

After playing in the 2015 Tippeligaen, his contract was due to expire, and as he struggled somewhat with injuries the contract was not renewed. He signed for third-tier club FK Tønsberg.

Amankwah joined Hobro IK in the Danish 1st Division on 24 January 2017. He left the club at the end of the 2018/19 season. In Stabæk he became captain following the autumn 2020 sale of Andreas Hanche-Olsen.

Career statistics

Personal life
Amankwah is the cousin of Ghanaian defensive midfielder, Emmanuel Frimpong, who formerly played for Arsenal.

References

1988 births
Living people
Footballers from Bergen
Norwegian people of Ghanaian descent
Norwegian footballers
Norwegian expatriate footballers
Expatriate men's footballers in Denmark
Norwegian expatriate sportspeople in Denmark
Fana IL players
SK Brann players
Alta IF players
Sandefjord Fotball players
FK Tønsberg players
Hobro IK players
Stabæk Fotball players
Eliteserien players
Norwegian First Division players
Danish Superliga players
Danish 1st Division players
Association football central defenders 

Association football defenders